Roar Kjernstad (1975, Espa, Norway) is a painter who specialises in traditional figurative work. He trained at the Nansen Academy in Lillehammer and at the Royal Academy of Fine Arts, Antwerp, focusing at the latter on study of the Old Masters.

In his view, painters and artists in general should be craftsmen. He is a part of the traditional figurative school of painting, which is related to The Kitsch Movement of Odd Nerdrum and the retrogard movement. But unlike Nerdrum and according to the retrogardists, Kjernstad still believes that traditional and figurative artists should claim the term "art" rather than use the name "kitsch" for their work. The use of the term "kitsch" shows no respect to the skills traditional and figurative artist need to have and to the eternal values of beauty they believe in.

References

External links
Official site
http://users.skynet.be/hdeboeck
http://www.friekunster.no/Roar.html
http://www.retrogarde.org/

1975 births
Living people
20th-century Norwegian painters
21st-century Norwegian painters
Royal Academy of Fine Arts (Antwerp) alumni